Defending champions Martina Navratilova and Pam Shriver defeated Kathy Jordan and Anne Smith in the final, 6–4, 6–3 to win the doubles tennis title at the 1982 Avon Championships. It was Navratilova's fifth Tour Finals doubles title, and Shriver's second.

Draw

References
 Official Results Archive (ITF)
 Official Results Archive (WTA)

1982 WTA Tour
Doubles